James Watson (born 1928) is an American biologist and chemist, the co-discoverer of the double-helical structure of DNA, awarded the 1962 Nobel Prize in Physiology or Medicine.

James Watson may also refer to:

Arts and entertainment 
 James Watson (actor) (born 1970), British movie and TV actor
 James Watson (author) (1936–2015), author from Lancashire, England
 James Watson (engraver) (c. 1739–1790), Irish engraver
 James Sibley Watson (1894–1982), American publisher and early experimenter in motion pictures
 James Watson (trumpeter) (1951–2011), British trumpet player, conductor, and professor at the Royal Academy of Music
 James Aaron Watson, country musician

Law 
 James F. Watson (1840–1897), American attorney and judge
 James Lopez Watson (1922–2001), U.S. federal judge, first black judge to head a federal court in the South
 James S. Watson (1882–1952), first black judge elected in New York State

Military 
 James Watson (British Army officer) (1772–1862), Commander-in-Chief in India
 James Watson (American soldier) (1850–?), American soldier who fought in the Battle of Little Bighorn
 James A. Watson (born 1956), rear admiral in the U.S. Coast Guard

Politics 
 James Watson (Australian politician) (1837–1907), colonial treasurer of New South Wales, 1878–1883
 James Watson (MP) (1817–1895), English merchant, dairy herdsman, and Conservative politician, House of Commons 1885–92
 James Watson (New York politician) (1750–1806), U.S. Senator from New York
 James Cameron Watson (1891–1986), Canadian politician, mayor of Calgary
 James Eli Watson (1864–1948), U.S. Congressman and Senator from Indiana
 James H. Watson (1845–1908), English-born merchant and political figure in Newfoundland
 James W. Watson (1849–?), Scottish-born Wisconsin state assemblyman

Scientists and scholars
 James Craig Watson (1838–1880), Canadian-American astronomer
 James Wreford Watson (1915–1990), Scottish/Canadian geographer and cartographer
 James L. Watson (anthropologist) (born 1947), professor of anthropology at Harvard
 James Watson (Scottish chemist) (1859–1923), Scottish chemist and political activist
 Sir James Anderson Scott Watson, Scottish agriculturalist

Sport 
 James Watson (footballer, born c. 1883) (c. 1883–?), Scottish footballer (Sunderland AFC and Middlesbrough FC)
 James Watson (Rangers footballer) (died 1915), Scottish footballer (Rangers FC and Scotland)
 James Watson (wrestler) (born 1973), professional wrestler who used the pseudonym Mikey Whipwreck

Other 
 James Watson (printer) (1644–1722), Scottish printer and publisher
 James Watson (radical) (1799–1874), English publisher, activist, and Chartist
 James Watson (murderer) (born 1981), English murderer

See also 
 Jamie Watson (disambiguation)
 Jim Watson (disambiguation)